Meslières is a commune in the Doubs département in the Bourgogne-Franche-Comté region in eastern France.

Geography
The population is divided between the valley of the Gland River and the plateau.

Population

See also
 Communes of the Doubs department

References

External links

 Official website 
 Meslières on the intercommunal Web site of the department 

Communes of Doubs